Brainstorm is a German power metal band formed in 1989 by guitarists Torsten Ihlenfeld and Milan Loncaric, and drummer Dieter Bernert. The band features lead singer Andy B. Franck, who is also noted for his other band, Symphorce. They are known to play a somewhat darker style of music than most power metal groups.

Band members 
Current
 Torsten Ihlenfeld – guitars, backing vocals (1989-present)
 Milan Loncaric – guitars, backing vocals (1989-present)
 Dieter Bernert – drums (1989-present)
 Andy B. Franck – vocals (1999-present)
 Andreas Armbruster - bass (2022-present)

Former
 Stefan Fronk – vocals (1990–1991)
 Marcus Jürgens – vocals (1991–1999)
 Henning Basse – vocals (live only)
 Peter Waldstätter – bass (1990)
 Andreas Mailänder – bass (1990–2007)
 Antonio Ieva - bass (2007-2022)

Timeline

Discography 

Studio albums
 Hungry (1997)
 Unholy (1998)
 Ambiguity (2000)
 Metus Mortis (2001)
 Soul Temptation (2003)
 Liquid Monster (2005)
 Downburst (2008)
 Memorial Roots (2009)
 On the Spur of the Moment (2011)
 Firesoul (2014)
 Scary Creatures (2016)
 Midnight Ghost (2018)
 Wall of Skulls (2021)

Compilation albums
 Just Highs No Lows (12 Years of Persistence) (2009)

Singles
 "All Those Words" (2005)
 "Fire Walk with Me" (2007)

DVD
 Honey from the B's (Beasting Around the Bush) (2007)

See also 
 Symphorce

References

External links 
 Official website
 Brainstorm on Encyclopedia Metallum

German musical groups
German power metal musical groups
German heavy metal musical groups
Metal Blade Records artists